Vyshyvanka Day is an international holiday that aims to preserve the Ukrainian folk traditions of creating and wearing ethnic embroidered clothes called vyshyvankas. It is celebrated every third Thursday of May. Vyshyvankas are, along with pysankas (traditional Ukrainian Easter eggs), one of the best known symbols of Ukrainian culture.

The holiday is not tied to any state, ethnicity or religion. It is not a public holiday.

History 

Voroniuk suggested that her classmates and students choose one day and wear vyshyvanka shirts all together. Initially, several dozen students and several faculty members wore embroidered shirts. But in the following years, the holiday grew to an all-Ukrainian level. Later it attracted the Ukrainian diaspora around the world, as well as supporters of Ukraine. The day of celebration was intentionally set on a weekday and not in the weekend to emphasise that the vyshyvanka is "a component of the life and culture of Ukrainians, and not an ancient artifact".

The fifth anniversary of the holiday in 2011 was marked by setting the Guinness World Records for the largest number of people dressed in embroidered shirts and gathered in one place. More than 4,000 people in vyshyvanka shirts gathered on Chernivtsi's . The same year, a huge embroidered shirt (4 × 10 metres) was sewn for the central building of Chernivtsi University.

Vyshyvanka Day in 2015 was celebrated under the slogan "Give the vyshyvanka to a defender". It was a campaign launched to raise the fighting spirit of Ukrainian soldiers in the Russo-Ukrainian War. The holiday was marked on a global scale, about 50 countries of the world joined the action.

References 

2006 establishments in Ukraine
May observances
Observances in Ukraine
Recurring events established in 2006
Society of Ukraine
Spring (season) events in Ukraine
Ukrainian culture